Kelly Evernden was the defending champion but lost in the first round to Lars-Anders Wahlgren.

Emilio Sánchez won in the final 6–7(3–7), 6–4, 4–6, 6–4, 6–1 against Richey Reneberg.

Seeds
A champion seed is indicated in bold text while text in italics indicates the round in which that seed was eliminated.

  Emilio Sánchez (champion)
  Andrei Chesnokov (quarterfinals)
  Magnus Gustafsson (first round)
  Kelly Evernden (first round)
  Paolo Canè (semifinals)
  Javier Sánchez (first round)
  Paul Chamberlin (second round)
  Richey Reneberg (final)

Draw

 NB: The Final was the best of 5 sets while all other rounds were the best of 3 sets.

Final

Section 1

Section 2

References
 1990 BP National Championships Draw

BP National Championships
BP National Championships